Quiet Nights of Blood and Pain is a 2009 American horror film written and directed by Andrew Copp. It was the last feature-length film that Copp shot prior to his death in 2013.

Plot 
In 2007, William, a psychotic Iraq veteran, murders a war protester and the man's girlfriend, and poses their bodies in a manner evocative of incidents such as Abu Ghraib. Elsewhere, Adrienne, another veteran of the conflict in the Middle East, learns that she will be receiving no government assistance for her posttraumatic stress disorder, which drives her to try to cope with it via marijuana that she procures from Ray, a friend who served in the Vietnam War.

While at a bookstore, William is enraged by the liberal views expressed by two of the clerks, so he kills them, and covers their corpses with pages ripped out of a copy of The Interrogators: Inside the Secret War Against al-Qaeda. After accompanying Ray to a group therapy session, Adrienne is attacked by a pair of rapists, but she is saved by William, who stabs the criminals to death while Adrienne flees.

William subsequently waterboards and beheads a janitor who was a member of an environmental activist group, gives money to a homeless and hobbled veteran, converses with Daniel, his jingoistic older brother who was disfigured in the Gulf War, and kills two supporters of MoveOn.org. Adrienne, who a suspicious William begins to stalk, contemplates suicide due to her worsening mental state, which leads her to take peyote provided by Ray.

William slits Ray's throat, convinced that he is a dissident, and abducts Adrienne, who he tortures for "disloyalty" and to try to obtain information on other "Un-Americans". Adrienne breaks free of her restraints and tries to escape, but is fatally stabbed by William. A spasming Adrienne hacks William in the neck with a meat cleaver, and the two die together while William whispers, "I was just following orders."

Cast

Reception 
The film was well received by Craig McGee of Horror News, who wrote, "If you’re expecting huge production values and top-notch professional actors, and THX sound, then you'll probably want to sit this one out. But those of us that love and embrace the indie horror world will be enjoying watching what everyone did with obviously so little money to get the job done. In the end, I was impressed, at times shocked, and once or twice even a little moved by it all". Rogue Cinema's Brian Morton also commended Quiet Night of Blood and Pain, awarding it a score of 3/4, and noting that "it's not perfect, but it's a cool throwback to a lost era of filmmaking and Copp should be commended for doing this!"

References

External links 
 

American slasher films
Anti-war films
Iraq War films
American splatter films
2000s war films
Camcorder films
2009 horror films
Films about drugs
Films set in 2007
Films set in Ohio
American war films
2000s exploitation films
Films shot in Ohio
American serial killer films
Films about activists
2000s English-language films
2009 independent films
2009 films
2009 direct-to-video films
American independent films
Direct-to-video horror films
American direct-to-video films
Films about American military personnel
Films about post-traumatic stress disorder
2000s political films
2000s American films